Morrisonville may refer to:

United States
Morrisonville, Illinois, a village
Morrisonville, New York, a hamlet
Morrisonville, Virginia, an unincorporated community
Morrisonville, Louisiana, an abandoned community
Morrisonville, Wisconsin, an unincorporated community